Carol Galley is a businesswoman who, as a director of Mercury Asset Management, was regarded as the most powerful woman in the City of London in the 1990s.

She was educated at Gosforth Grammar School in Newcastle upon Tyne and at the University of Leicester.

She no longer actively makes fund management decisions. She featured on the 2006 Sunday Times Rich List with a personal wealth of £80 million.

References

Alumni of the University of Leicester
Living people
Year of birth missing (living people)
Businesspeople from Newcastle upon Tyne
People educated at Gosforth Academy